Bartolomé Clavero Salvador (1947 – 30 September 2022) was a Spanish jurist and historian, specialized in legal history.

Clavero was a tenured full professor at the University of Seville. His works focus on usury, majorat and the concept of State during the Ancien Régime (or its lack thereof), with a materialistic point of view and often polemical content. He was a personal friend and biographer of Francisco Tomás y Valiente, who was murdered by ETA just five minutes after they had a conversation on the phone. Clavero died on 30 September 2022, at the age of 75.

Works
Freedom's Law and Indigenous Rights. Berkeley, California, Estados Unidos. Robbins Collection—School of Law. 2005. 202. 
Tratados con Otros Pueblos y Derechos de Otras Gentes en la Constitución de Estados Por América. Madrid. Centro de Estudios Políticos y Constitucionales. 2005. 150. 
Genocidio y Justicia. la Destrucción de las Indias, Ayer y Hoy. Madrid,. Marcial Pons. 2002. 
Ama Llunku, Abya Yala : Constituyencia Indígena y Código Ladino Por América. Madrid. Centro de Estudios Políticos y Constitucionales. 2000. 483. 
Happy Constitution. Madrid. Trotta. 1997
La Grâce Du Don. París. Albin Michel. 1996

Diritto Della Società Internazionale. Milano. Jaca Book. 1995
Derecho Indígena y Cultura Constitucional en América. México. Siglo XXI. 1994
Historia del Derecho: Derecho Común. Salamanca. Universidad de Salamanca. 1994
Antidora. Antropología Católica de la Economía Moderna. Milán. Giuffrè. 1991
Razón de Estado, Razón de Individuo, Razón de Historia. Madrid. Centro de Estudios Politicos y Constitucionales. 1991
Manual de Historia Constitucional de España. Madrid. Alianza Editorial. 1989
Mayorazgo. Madrid. Siglo XXI. 1989
Los Derechos y los Jueces. Madrid. Civitas. 1988
Tantas Personas Como Estados. Madrid. Tecnos. 1986
Fueros Vascos. Historia en Tiempos de Constitución. Barcelona. Ariel. 1985
Usura. del Uso Económico de la Religión en la Historia. Madrid. Tecnos. 1985
Autonomía Regional y Reforma Agraria. Jerez. Fundación Universitaria de Jerez. 1984
Evolución Histórica del Constitucionalismo Español. Madrid. Tecnos. 1984
El Código y el Fuero. Madrid. Siglo XXI. 1982

References

External links
Bartolomé Clavero's personal site
 Bartolomé Clavero's blog

1947 births
2022 deaths
Place of birth missing
20th-century Spanish historians
21st-century Spanish historians
Academic staff of the University of Seville